A'au James Leuluai (born 4 February 1957) is a New Zealand former international rugby league .

Background
He is the father of former Widnes Vikings player Macgraff Leuluai and Wigan Warriors and New Zealand international Thomas Leuluai, and the uncle of former Leeds Rhinos prop Kylie Leuluai.

Playing career
A Mt Wellington junior, in his career Leuluai played for the Manly-Warringah Sea Eagles, Wakefield Trinity (Heritage №1007), Hull FC, Leigh (Heritage № 962), Ryedale-York and Doncaster. Leuluai also represented the New Zealand national rugby league team and New Zealand Māori. Between 1979 and 1986 he played in 29 test matches for New Zealand.

His Hull FC début, alongside fellow débutant Dane O'Hara and Gary Kemble (who had already appeared) came on 27 September 1981 against Castleford. Achievements over the next year included helping Hull to win the John Player Trophy, also being Premiership runners-up, and of course to lift the 1982 Challenge Cup, the first time the Challenge Cup had been back at the Boulevard since 1914.

A'au James Leuluai was an unused  interchange/substitute, i.e. number 14, in Hull FC's 14-14 draw with Widnes in the 1982 Challenge Cup Final during the 1981–82 season at Wembley Stadium, London on Saturday 1 May 1982, in front of a crowd of 92,147, and played right-, i.e. number 3, (Terry Day having played  in the first match) in the 18-9 victory over Widnes in the 1982 Challenge Cup Final replay during the 1981–82 season at Elland Road, Leeds on Wednesday 19 May 1982, in front of a crowd of 41,171,

Nicknamed "Lullaby", as he so often fell asleep off the field he was anything but sleepy on it, scoring many remarkable tries including what the Yorkshire Post described as "one of the greatest solo tries of all time" in the 1983 Challenge Cup semi-final victory over Castleford, passing four Castleford players and racing around half of the length of the field without a hand ever touching him until he had crossed the line.

Leuluai played left-, i.e. number 4, and scored 2-tries in Hull FC's 24-28 defeat by Wigan in the 1985 Challenge Cup Final during the 1984–85 season at Wembley Stadium, London on Saturday 4 May 1985, in front of a crowd of 99,801, in what is regarded as the most marvellous cup final in living memory, which Hull narrowly lost after fighting back from 12-28 down at half-time.

Leuluai played left-, i.e. number 4, in Hull FC's 18-7 victory over Bradford Northern in the 1982 Yorkshire County Cup Final during the 1982–83 season at Elland Road, Leeds on Saturday 2 October 1982, played left-, i.e. number 4, in the 13-2 victory over Castleford in the 1983 Yorkshire County Cup Final during the 1983–84 season at Elland Road, Leeds on Saturday 15 October 1983, and played , i.e. number 2, in the 29-12 victory over Hull Kingston Rovers in the 1984 Yorkshire County Cup Final during the 1984–85 season at Boothferry Park, Kingston upon Hull on Saturday 27 October 1984.

Leuluai played left-, i.e. number 4, in Hull FC's 12-4 victory over Hull Kingston Rovers in the 1981–82 John Player Trophy Final during the 1981–82 season at Headingley Rugby Stadium, Leeds on Saturday 23 January 1982, played left-, i.e. number 4, in the 12-0 victory over Hull Kingston Rovers in the 1984–85 John Player Special Trophy Final during the 1984–85 season at Boothferry Park, Kingston upon Hull on Saturday 26 January 1985.

In 1986/7, after failing to agree a new contract with Hull he was transfer listed at £50,000. "Jimmy" subsequently played 6 games on loan to Leigh before returning to the Boulevard for 3 more games and a further 27 in 1987 / 88.  In October 1988 he then signed for Wakefield Trinity, making his début in the 12-34 defeat by Wigan at Central Park, Wigan, playing 51 times over 2 seasons and scoring 12 tries.  In 1990/91 he moved to Ryedale-York, playing 7 matches and scoring 2 tries before ending his UK career at Doncaster the same year with 13 games and 1 try.  His last match on UK soil was a Doncaster home game to Leigh on 14 April 1991, played in front of just 1,557, a rather sad end to a great Rugby League career

Such was their subsequent commitment to the British game that Leuluai and his Hull counterparts Gary Kemble & Dane O'Hara (Fred Ah Kuoi had served 4 years with the Club at this point and so would not be eligible until the following year) saw the Government & Rugby Football League change rules and by laws regarding overseas players in 1986 to take those who had shown such commitment outside of the overseas player quotas.

After he had finished his English career, Leuluai returned to New Zealand and started playing for Wellington. He helped them defeat Auckland for the first time in 75 years. It was during this time in Wellington that Leuluai began his coaching career.

Coaching career
Leuluai was the coach of the Wellington City Dukes in the 1994 Lion Red Cup.

During the early seasons of the Bartercard Cup, Leuluai was the coach of the Eastern Tornadoes. He later took on the role of the Junior Kiwis in 2002.

Between 2003 and 2005 Leuluai was one of Daniel Andersons two assistant coaches with the New Zealand national rugby league team.

After a career of coaching New Zealand representative sides, Leuluai applied for the head coaching job of the New Zealand national rugby league team in 2005 and was heavily favoured to be appointed until he withdrew due to personal reasons. Brian McClennan was appointed coach instead.

In July 2007 Leuluai again applied to coach the New Zealand Kiwis but ultimately Gary Kemble was appointed coach. Leuluai served as assistant under Kemble.

In 2011 Leuluai co-coached the Mangere East Hawks in the Auckland Rugby League competition.

References

External links

1957 births
Living people
Auckland rugby league team players
Central Districts rugby league team players
Doncaster R.L.F.C. players
Hull F.C. players
Junior Kiwis coaches
James
Leigh Leopards players
Mangere East Hawks coaches
Manly Warringah Sea Eagles players
Mount Wellington Warriors coaches
Mount Wellington Warriors players
New Zealand Māori rugby league players
New Zealand Māori rugby league team players
New Zealand national rugby league team players
New Zealand rugby league coaches
New Zealand rugby league players
Petone Panthers players
Rugby league centres
Wakefield Trinity players
Wellington rugby league team coaches
Wellington rugby league team players
York Wasps players